The Liberty League men's basketball tournament is the annual conference basketball championship tournament for the NCAA Division III Liberty League. It is a single-elimination tournament and seeding is based on regular season records.

As conference champion, the winner receives the Liberty League's automatic bid to the NCAA Men's Division III Basketball Championship.

Results
Tournament results incomplete before 2004

Championship records
Results incomplete before 2004

 Schools highlighted in pink are former members of the Liberty League
 Bard, Rochester, RIT, and William Smith have not yet qualified for the Empire 8 tournament finals

References

NCAA Division III men's basketball conference tournaments
Basketball Tournament, Men's